Weiz is a town in the eastern part of the Austrian state of Styria.

Population

International relations

Twin towns – Sister cities
Weiz is twinned with:
  Ajka, Hungary
  Grodzisk Mazowiecki, Poland
  Offenburg, Germany

References

Cities and towns in Weiz District